"The Conscription of Troops" is a short story by Franz Kafka. It details the process of organizing troops for combat. First, every citizen reports to their homes, then the chief inspects each residence to ensure that every member of the house is at home and that the people who are fit for service are registered. Then a young woman from another town goes to a house, dressed up in order to be noticed by the chief. She is apparently looking for a suitor. However, he pays no attention to her and later she is struck by one of his soldiers. The narrator states no one from other towns, and especially no woman, is to be conscripted.

Short stories by Franz Kafka